The LCDR Second Sondes class was a class of six  steam locomotives. They were designed by William Martley for the London, Chatham and Dover Railway (LCDR), and built at the LCDR's Longhedge works during 1865, using components from the Sondes class 4-4-0ST locomotives, including the boilers.

In November 1875, William Kirtley (who had replaced Martley following the latter's death in 1874) allotted the class letter F. During 1876–78, the locomotives were rebuilt with new boilers and cylinders; at the same time they were given numbers, the names being removed. They passed to the South Eastern and Chatham Railway (SECR) at the start of 1899, and their numbers were increased by 459 to avoid duplication with former South Eastern Railway locomotives. New boilers were again provided in 1905–07, but all six locomotives were withdrawn in 1909.

The names were all retained from the Sondes class.

Notes

References

External links
Sondes class 2-4-0T 61 originally named CRAMPTON seen as SECR number 520 at Holborn Viaduct 17 October 1902

Sondes 2
2-4-0T locomotives
Railway locomotives introduced in 1865
Scrapped locomotives
Standard gauge steam locomotives of Great Britain